Vălari may refer to several places in Romania:

 Vălari, a village in Stăneşti Commune, Gorj County
 Vălari, a village in Topliţa Commune, Hunedoara County